George G. Ritchie (25 September 1923 – 29 October 2007) was an American psychiatrist who held positions as president of the Richmond Academy of General Practice; chairman of the Department of Psychiatry of Towers Hospital; and founder and president of the Universal Youth Corps, Inc. for almost 20 years. In 1967 he entered private psychiatry practice in Charlottesville, Virginia, and in 1983 moved to Anniston, Alabama, to serve as head of the Department of Psychiatry at the Northeast Alabama Regional Medical Center. He returned to Richmond in 1986 to continue in private practice until retirement in 1992.

Near-death experience
At the age of 20, George Ritchie apparently died in an army hospital and was pronounced dead twice by the doctor on duty. Nine minutes later he returned to life. Ritchie wrote of his near-death experience (NDE) in Return from Tomorrow, co-written with Elizabeth Sherrill (1928-), and published in 1978. In the book he tells of his out-of-body experience, his meeting with Jesus Christ, and his travel with Christ through different dimensions of time and space. Return from Tomorrow has been translated into nine languages. He also published another book, Ordered to Return, soon after to elaborate on his heavenly experience.

Ritchie's story was the first contact Raymond Moody had with NDEs, during his post-graduate studies and residency in Psychiatry at the University of Virginia. This led Moody to investigate over 150 cases of NDEs in his book Life After Life and two other books that followed.

Death
Ritchie died on October 29, 2007 at his home in Irvington, Virginia,  aged 84, following a long battle with cancer.

References

Bibliography
 George G. Ritchie and Elizabeth Sherrill, Return from Tomorrow. Old Tappan, NJ: F.H. Revell, 1978. .
 George G. Ritchie, Ordered to Return: My Life After Dying. Charlottesville, VA: Hampton Roads Publishing, 1998. .

External links
 Obituary, Anniston Star, October 31, 2007. Accessed 2007-12-18.
 Obituary, Richmond Times-Dispatch, October 31, 2007. Accessed 2007-12-18.
 Book review of Return from Tomorrow  by Joan Fulcher, April 19, 2002. Accessed 2007-12-18.
  (WebCite archive). Accessed 2009-06-02.
 Miracle at Easter by Sharon Barrett Kennedy: the story of a healing miracle "foretold by the Lord" to George Ritchie. Accessed 2007-12-18.

1923 births
2007 deaths
American psychiatrists
American spiritual writers
American Christian writers
Writers from Richmond, Virginia
Near-death experience researchers
People from Lancaster County, Virginia